Abdullah Haif Al-Shammeri (born 17 September 1993) is a Saudi professional footballer who plays as a defender for Al-Hazem and the Saudi Arabia national team.

References

External links
 

1993 births
Living people
Saudi Arabian footballers
People from Dir'iya
Association football defenders
Al-Jabalain FC players
Al-Taawoun FC players
Ittihad FC players
Al-Wehda Club (Mecca) players
Al-Hazem F.C. players
Saudi Second Division players
Saudi Professional League players
Saudi First Division League players
Saudi Arabia international footballers